Vu is a 2014 Tamil comedy film directed by Ashik, a student of Film technology from MGR Govt. Film and TV Institute in Chennai. The film features Thambi Ramiah for first time in lead role, alongside newcomers Varun, Madhan Gopal, Kuran, Simile Selva and Sathyasai. The film was released on 7 February 2014.

Cast

 Thambi Ramaiah as Ganesh
 Chakravarthy as Selvam
 Varun Shamrat as Singaraja / older Maaran
 Madhan Gopal as Mila
 Smile Selva as Bharathirasa
 Raj Kamal as Karthik
 Kaali Venkat as Veerakumar
 Bayilvan Ranganathan as Producer
 Nellai Siva as Krishnababu
 Venkatesh as Sub-inspector of police
 Deeparaj as Mani
 Sudhakar as Music director
 Ajith as younger Maaran
 Neha as older Raasathi
 Madhumitha as younger Raasathi
 Sathya Sai
 Aajeedh Khalique
 Sasi Karthi
 Rishikanth
 Doomz Khanna
 Yogi Devaraj
 Zubair
 Dev
 Bhaskar Raj
Murugaraj

Production
Producer and director Ashik stated: "When I narrated this script to National award winner Thambi Ramaiah, he not only appreciated it but also gave me the dates to shoot his portions, Although he is the main protagonist, the role cannot be considered so as there is no hero in this film. As for the story, Thambi Ramaiah’s character aims at achieving something he himself knows will be difficult." ‘Vu’ denotes the Pillaiyar Suzhi.

Hero Varun stated, "Director Ashik and I were friends in Vaishnava College. I was part of the theatre group Koothu-p-Pattarai for some time but this is the first time I am facing the camera. The heroine and I sport three looks in the film."

Music director Abhijith Ramaswami recalled, "I was part of my college band. I learnt the nuances of music direction from Sadanandam, a guitarist in Ilaiyaraja’s orchestra. I scored the music for Ashik’s short film Vanjam and he liked my work and gave me the chance to work on his feature film."

Heroine Neha: "A Chennai girl, she was studying for her BBA in Puducherry when she got the opportunity to fulfil her dream. A mutual friend introduced her to director Ashik who signed her up for his Vu."

Soundtrack
Music is composed by debutant Abijith Ramaswami, lyrics for all songs were written by Murugan Manthiram. Thambi Ramaiah has sung a song called "Oru Padi Mela". "Thikki Thenarudhu" was sung by Aajeedh, winner of Vijay TV Airtel Super Singer Junior 2012 apart from acting in the film. The newly elected Directors’ Union president, director Vikraman released the audio, while  the south head of UTV Motion Pictures Dhananjayan received it, P. L. Thenappan, S. S. Kumaran, and G. N. R. Kumaravelan graced the event. Behindwoods wrote:"Sparkles in bits".

 "Kaalin Keezhey" - C. G. Krishnan
 "Thikki Thenurudhu" - Aajeedh Khalique, Sruthi
 "Oru Padi Mela" - Thambi Ramaiah, Arun, Ashik, C. G. Krishnan
 "Aahaa Idhu Cinema" - Mukesh Mohamed
 "Chinna kuzhandhai" - Velmurugan
 "Thikki Thenurudhu" (Seniors) - Aditya Kashyap, Vandhana

Critical reception
The Indian Express wrote: "Innovative in his thinking, debutant director Ashik seems to be bursting with ideas. If only they were all put together in a more coherent and a consistent manner" The Times of India wrote: "Its premise is filled with the promise of a madcap film that could also serve as a commentary on the industry's follies. But what we get is an amateurish comedy that is only infrequently funny and often exasperating".

References

External links
 

2014 films
2010s Tamil-language films